Gilmar Jalith Mayo Lozano (born 30 September 1969) is a Colombian high jumper. This is the current Colombian and South American record. Mayo represented Colombia twice at the Olympic Games (1996 and 2000) and three times at the World Championships in Athletics (1995, 1997 and 1999).

Mayo was the 2006 Central American and Caribbean Games champion in the high jump and competed at the Pan American Games in 1991, 1995, 1999 and 2007, which included a bronze on his second appearance at the competition. He was a four-time champion at the South American Championships in Athletics (1991, 1995, 1997, 2005) and a three-time gold medallist at the South American Games – this includes the 1998 South American Games where he also won the triple jump title and the long jump silver medal. He was a frequent participant at the Ibero-American Championships in Athletics and was the gold medallist there in 2000 and 2002.

International competitions

References

1969 births
Living people
Colombian male high jumpers
Colombian male long jumpers
Colombian male triple jumpers
Olympic athletes of Colombia
Athletes (track and field) at the 1996 Summer Olympics
Athletes (track and field) at the 2000 Summer Olympics
Pan American Games medalists in athletics (track and field)
Athletes (track and field) at the 1991 Pan American Games
Athletes (track and field) at the 1995 Pan American Games
Athletes (track and field) at the 1999 Pan American Games
Athletes (track and field) at the 2007 Pan American Games
World Athletics Championships athletes for Colombia
People from Cesar Department
Pan American Games bronze medalists for Colombia
South American Games gold medalists for Colombia
South American Games silver medalists for Colombia
South American Games medalists in athletics
Central American and Caribbean Games gold medalists for Colombia
Competitors at the 1994 South American Games
Competitors at the 1998 South American Games
Competitors at the 1998 Central American and Caribbean Games
Competitors at the 2002 Central American and Caribbean Games
Competitors at the 2006 Central American and Caribbean Games
Central American and Caribbean Games medalists in athletics
Medalists at the 1995 Pan American Games
20th-century Colombian people
21st-century Colombian people